The 2012 Women's Six Nations Championship, also known as the 2012 RBS Women's Six Nations due to the tournament's sponsorship by the Royal Bank of Scotland, was the 11th series of the Women's Six Nations Championship, an annual women's rugby union competition between six European rugby union national teams. Matches were held in February and March 2012, on the same weekends as the men's tournament, if not always the same day.

The championship was contested by England, France, Ireland, Italy, Scotland and Wales. England were favourites to win the tournament, and did so – their victory being their seventh title in a row, winning without conceding a try – the first time this had been achieved in the Six Nations.

The tournament marked a significant step-forward in the broadcasting of matches. Three of England's five games were available to the armchair viewer – their home matches against Wales (broadcast live in the UK by the BBC), their game against Ireland (webcast by the RFU), and their away game against France (broadcast in France by France4 and in the UK by Sky – the first time any women's international had been shown on French national TV). Ireland v Scotland was also webcast by the IRFU – the first Irish women's home game ever broadcast. In addition Wales played at the Millennium Stadium for the first time, following the men's game between Wales and Italy, though this was not broadcast.

Table

Fixtures and results

Week 1

Week 2

Week 3

Rearranged fixture

Week 4

Week 5

Leading scorers

Point scorers

References

External links
The official RBS Six Nations Site

2012
2012 rugby union tournaments for national teams
2011–12 in Irish rugby union
2011–12 in English rugby union
2011–12 in Welsh rugby union
2011–12 in Scottish rugby union
2011–12 in French rugby union
2011–12 in Italian rugby union
2011–12 in European women's rugby union
rugby union
rugby union
rugby union
rugby union
Women
rugby union
rugby union
Women's Six Nations
Women's Six Nations